Ernesto Schifelbein Fuenzalida (born 19 August 1934) is a Chilean politician who served as minister. Similarly, in 2007, he was awarded the National Education Prize.

In 2011, he assumed as head of the Autonomous University of Chile.

References

External links
 Profile at Annales de la República

1934 births

Living people
Chilean people of German descent
20th-century Chilean lawyers
Metropolitan University of Educational Sciences alumni
University of Chile alumni
Harvard University alumni
Heads of universities in Chile
Academic staff of the University of Chile
Academic staff of the Metropolitan University of Educational Sciences